Bruce Tabashnik is an American entomologist best known for Bt cotton efficacy research. He is a professor and researcher at the University of Arizona.

Lecturing career 
Tabashnik is a professor in the University of Arizona's Department of Entomology.

Recognition 
In 2007 Tabashnik was made a Fellow of the Entomological Society of America. Then in 2020 he was given the Lifetime Achievement Award by the ESA's Plant-Insect Ecosystems section. His honorary lecture was given by longtime collaborator, Yves Carriére.

Notable publications

References 

American entomologists
American agronomists
University of Arizona faculty
Year of birth missing (living people)
Living people